4′,7-Dihydroxyflavone is a flavone. It is found in Medicago truncatula in relation with the root nodulation symbiont Sinorhizobium meliloti or in seeds of Sophora viciifolia.

Like many other flavonoids, 4′,7-dihydroxyflavone has been found to possess activity at opioid receptors in vitro. Specifically, it acts as an antagonist of the μ-opioid receptor and, with lower affinity, of the κ- and δ-opioid receptors.

See also 
 Pratol (7-hydroxy-4′-methoxyflavone) is the O-methylated form of the molecule.

References 

Flavones
Kappa-opioid receptor antagonists
Mu-opioid receptor antagonists